Ive or IVE may refer to:

Music
 Ive (group), a South Korean girl group
 I've Sound (aka "I've"), a Japanese musical group

People
 Sir Jonathan Ive (born 1967), a British industrial designer
 Ive (given name), a Croatian and Slovenian given name

Other uses
 "I've", a contraction (grammar) for "I have"
 Ive, Latvia, a rural municipality in Latvia
 Institute of the Incarnate Word (Instituto del Verbo Encarnado), a Catholic religious order
 International Video Entertainment, a former name of Artisan Entertainment
 Hong Kong Institute of Vocational Education

See also
 Ives, a surname
 Evie (disambiguation)
 Eve (disambiguation)
 Evi (disambiguation)
 Evy (disambiguation)
 Ivy (disambiguation)
 Yve
 Ivey (disambiguation)
 Eevee